West Liberty Borough was a borough in Allegheny County, Pennsylvania, United States from 1876 to 1909.  West Liberty Borough was incorporated on March 7, 1876 from the western part of Lower St. Clair Township.  The borough was a small village along the Pittsburgh and Washington Road near Mount Washington.  West Liberty Borough was absorbed by the city of Pittsburgh in 1909.  It is today the Brookline neighborhood, Bon Air neighborhood, and part of the Beechview neighborhood.

Boroughs in Allegheny County, Pennsylvania
Former municipalities in Pennsylvania
1876 establishments in Pennsylvania
1909 disestablishments in Pennsylvania